James Bucknall Grimston, 3rd Viscount Grimston (9 May 1747 – 30 December 1808) was a British peer, born the heir to his Irish peerage, and Member of Parliament whose service in Parliament for seven years led to his, and his male descendants', ennoblement into the Peerage of Great Britain.

Grimston was the son of James Grimston, 2nd Viscount Grimston, and Mary Bucknall. He was educated at Eton and Trinity Hall, Cambridge. He succeeded his father in the viscountcy in 1773 but as this was an Irish peerage it did not entitle him to a seat in the House of Lords. He was instead elected to the House of Commons for St Albans in 1783, a seat he held until the next year's election, where he instead stood for and represented the larger, county-level seat of Hertfordshire from 1784 to 1790. In 1790 he was created Baron Verulam, of Gorhambury in the County of Hertford, in the Peerage of Great Britain, which gave him a seat in the House of Lords.

Lord Grimston married Harriot Walter (1756–1786), daughter of Edward Walter of Bury Hill, Westcott, Surrey and Harriot Forrester, daughter of George Forrester, 5th Lord Forrester. He died in December 1808, aged 61, and was succeeded in his titles by his son James, who was created Earl of Verulam in 1815.

Notes

References 
Kidd, Charles, Williamson, David (editors). Debrett's Peerage and Baronetage (1990 edition). New York: St Martin's Press, 1990, 

1747 births
1808 deaths
Viscounts in the Peerage of Ireland
Peers of Great Britain created by George III
Members of the Parliament of Great Britain for Hertfordshire
British MPs 1780–1784
British MPs 1784–1790
Fellows of the Royal Society
People educated at Eton College
Alumni of Trinity Hall, Cambridge
James